Thiotricha prunifolivora is a moth of the family Gelechiidae. It was described by Ueda and Fujiwara in 2005. It is found in Japan (Honshu,
Ryukyus).

The wingspan is 3-4.5 mm for males and 4.7–5 mm for females. The forewings are glossy white, with a narrow black costal streak and a brownish oblique fascia running from just before the apical one-fourth of the costa to the apical one-third of the termen. There is a brownish triangular mark on the costa from just beyond the apical one-fourth to before the apex, cut by an inwardly oblique strigula. There is also a black bar at the apex and a dark brownish circular mark on the tornus, as well as two narrow brownish streaks running from the apical black bar to above and beneath the margins of the brownish tornal mark. The hindwings are pale greyish brown, suffused with greyish brown on the costa and termen.

The larvae feed on Symplocos prunifolia.

References

Moths described in 2005
Thiotricha